KGFX-FM (92.7 FM, "River 92.7") is a radio station broadcasting a Top 40 format. Licensed to Pierre, South Dakota, United States, the station serves the Pierre area.  The station is currently owned by James River Broadcasting.

All four Pierre DRG Media Group (James River Broadcasting) stations share studios at 214 West Pleasant Drive, in Pierre.

History
The station began in the 1980s as KG93 with a Top 40 (CHR) music format.  Later, the format was changed to classic rock and the station was known as 92-7 The Fox. Later, it flipped to Hot Adult Contemporary format as River 92.7. In March 2013, the station transitioned to Top 40 (CHR) keeping the River 92.7 moniker.

References

External links

GFX-FM
Contemporary hit radio stations in the United States
Radio stations established in 1983